Thomas James John (born 22 March 1995) is a Welsh footballer.

Career
John was born in Port Talbot, Wales. He started his career in the youth team of Hereford United, and was one of five signed on a scholarship by John Layton. He made his professional debut for the club in a League Cup second-round tie against Aston Villa in a 2–0 defeat, replacing Stuart Fleetwood in the final minute.

References

External links

1995 births
Living people
Sportspeople from Port Talbot
Welsh footballers
Association football midfielders
Hereford United F.C. players